Lampetra is a genus of lampreys in the subfamily Petromyzontinae.

Phylogenetic studies indicate that this genus as presently defined is polyphyletic, with species of this genus from western North America forming a clade that forms the sister group to Lethenteron, Eudontomyzon, and Lampetra sensu stricto (eastern North American and European species).

Species
The currently recognized species in this genus are:
 Lampetra aepyptera (C. C. Abbott, 1860) (Least brook lamprey)
 Lampetra alavariensis Mateus, Alves, Quintella & P. R. Almeida, 2013 (Portuguese lamprey)
 Lampetra auremensis Mateus, Alves, Quintella & P. R. Almeida, 2013 (Qurem lamprey) 
 Lampetra ayresii (Günther, 1870) (Western river lamprey)
 Lampetra fluviatilis (Linnaeus, 1758) (European river lamprey)
 Lampetra hubbsi (Vladykov & Kott 1976) (Kern brook lamprey)
 Lampetra lamottei (Lesueur, 1827) (Brook lamprey)
 Lampetra lanceolata Kux & H. M. Steiner, 1972 (Turkish brook lamprey)
 Lampetra lusitanica Mateus, Alves, Quintella & P. R. Almeida, 2013
 Lampetra pacifica Vladykov 1973 (Pacific brook lamprey)
 Lampetra planeri (Bloch, 1784) (European brook lamprey)
 Lampetra richardsoni (Vladykov & Follett, 1965) (Western brook lamprey)

References 

 
Jawless fish genera
Taxonomy articles created by Polbot